Thomas Chapin (March 9, 1957 – February 13, 1998) was an American composer and saxophonist/multi-instrumentalist. Though primarily an alto saxophonist, he also played sopranino, as well as  soprano, tenor, baritone saxes and flute. Many of his recordings as a leader were in a trio with bassist Mario Pavone and drummer Michael Sarin. Chapin studied with Jackie McLean , Paul Jeffrey , and Lionel Hampton. He died of leukemia three weeks before his 41st birthday. He played at a benefit concert two weeks before his death.

Career
Chapin was born on March 9, 1957, in Manchester, Connecticut. He attended Phillips Academy in Andover, Massachusetts where he studied classical music and jazz. In the late 1970s he attended the Hartt School of Music at the University of Hartford in Connecticut, studying with saxophonist Jackie McLean. In 1980 he graduated from Rutgers University where he studied with saxophonist Paul Jeffrey, pianist Kenny Barron and guitarist Ted Dunbar. From 1981 to 1986 he toured with Lionel Hampton as lead saxophonist and musical director. He performed with Chico Hamilton's band from 1988 to 1989.

In the late 1980s he formed quartets, quintets, and a band and album devoted to Brazilian music, Spirits Rebellious (Alacra). He founded Machine Gun with guitarist Robert Musso and a trio with bassist Mario Pavone and drummers Steve Johns and later Michael Sarin. In 1994 the trio performed at Madarao Jazz Festival in Japan, where he also played with Betty Carter, and at the Newport Jazz Festival in 1995. He formed larger groups (Trio with Brass, Insomnia, Haywire, and Trio with Strings) and performed with Ray Drummond, Anthony Braxton, Tom Harrell, Sonny Sharrock, John Zorn, Walter Thompson, Dave Douglas, Marty Ehrlich, and Ned Rothenberg. He recorded over fifteen albums as a leader.

Chapin died of leukemia in 1998 at the age of forty.

Discography

As leader and co-leader

As sideman
With Machine Gun
 Machine Gun (MU 1988)
 Open Fire (Mu New York 1989)
 Pass the Ammo (MuWorks, 1991)
 WFMU (MuWorks, 2000)
 Live at CBGB's Vol 1 06/02/87 (Musso Music, 2007)
 Live at the Gas Station 12/03/88 (Musso Music, 2007)

With Mario Pavone
 Sharpeville (Alacra, 1988)
 Toulon Days (New World/CounterCurrents, 1992)
 Song for Septet (New World/CounterCurrents, 1994)
 Dancers Tales (Knitting Factory, 1997)

With others
 Borah Bergman, Toronto 1997 (Boxholder, 2003)
 Michael Blake, Kingdom of Champa (Intuition, 1997)
 Anthony Braxton & Mario Pavone, Seven Standards 1995 (Knitting Factory, 1995)
 Barbara Dennerlein, Junkanoo (Verve, 1997)
 Armen Donelian, Quartet Language (Playscape, 2003)
 Ray Drummond, Continuum (Arabesque, 1994)
 Pamela Fleming, Fearless Dreamer (Infinite Room, 1998)
 Lionel Hampton, Made in Japan (Glad-Hamp, 1984)
 Lionel Hampton, Sentimental Journey (Glad-Hamp, 1985)
 William Hooker, Crossing Points (NoBusiness 2011)
 Frank London, Scientist at Work (Tzadik, 2002)
 Medeski Martin & Wood,  Notes from the Underground (Accurate, 1992)
 Robert Musso, Active Resonance (Tokuma, 1992)
 Ned Rothenberg, Overlays (Moers Music, 1991)
 Ned Rothenberg, Real and Imagined Time (Moers Music, 1995)
 Daniel Schnyder, Tarantula (Enja, 1996)
 Peggy Stern, The Fuchsia (Koch, 1997)
 Walter Thompson, The Colonel (Nine Winds 1998)
 Axel Zwingenberger, The Boogie Woogie Album (Telefunken, 1982)

Books 

 Thomas Chapin. Ten Compositions (sheet music book of original compositions) (Peace Park Publishing/Akasha; US)

Documentaries 
Music Man: Thomas Chapin  directed by Terri Castillo, 1989
  directed by Terri Castillo, 1991
 with features of the Thomas Chapin Trio  directed by Richard Buxenbaum for Festival Productions, 1995
  directed by Stephanie J. Castillo, 2004
Night Bird Song: The Thomas Chapin Story directed by Stephanie J. Castillo, released in 2016, winner "Best Story" Award, 2016 Nice (France) International Film Festival; shown at Monterey (CA) Jazz Fest, Sept., 2016

References

External links
Thomas Chapin official site
Thomas Chapin Film site
Jazz Archive at Duke University
Thomas Chapin Papers.  Rubenstein Library, Duke University
 "The Thomas Chapin Era", Jazz Halo, July 2016

Avant-garde jazz musicians
Phillips Academy alumni
1957 births
Jazz alto saxophonists
Deaths from leukemia
Arabesque Records artists
1998 deaths
Rutgers University alumni
20th-century saxophonists
Machine Gun (band) members
Knitting Factory Records artists
NoBusiness Records artists